Neuenburg am Rhein (High Alemannic: Neiburg am Rhi) is a town in the district Breisgau-Hochschwarzwald in Baden-Württemberg in southern Germany.

Geography

Geographical location

Neuenburg is elevated on the right bank of the Altrhein on a terrace between the Vosges and the Black Forest, halfway between Freiburg im Breisgau and Basel at the former confluence of the Klemmbach in the Rhine.

Here, a path from the Black Forest (Todtnau) to Mulhouse, the current Bundesstraße 378, crosses with the old waterway transport route Rhine. In addition, at the time of the town's founding by the Zähringer, one of the few fords across the Rhine was located here. In the thalweg of the Altrhein lies the state border between Germany and France. Nowadays, the Grand Canal d'Alsace on the French side of the border runs parallel to the Altrhein.

Extension of the urban area

The city also has an oak forest in the Black Forest.

Neighboring municipalities

Neighboring municipalities are in the north Hartheim am Rhein and Eschbach, in the northeast Heitersheim and Buggingen, in the east Müllheim and Auggen, in the southeast Schliengen and in the south Bad Bellingen. To the west of the Rhine, in the Alsace, the municipality Chalampé, as well as the communes Ottmarsheim und Bantzenheim are located.

Town structure

In addition to the core town district Neuenburg (with the settlement "Im Stein"), the town has three districts: Steinenstadt, Grißheim and Zienken.

History

Until the 19th century

Neuenburg am Rhein was founded in 1175 by Berthold IV, Duke of Zähringen, in the shape of a cross at the intersection of two roads. The immediate cause of the foundation was the expansion by the Hohenstaufen family from their possessions in Badenweiler toward their possessions in the Alsace. By founding Neuenburg, the Zähringen family could control the crossing of the Rhine river and exact a toll. The Zähringens, however, died out in 1218.

The Benedictine Gutnau Priory, according to a note in abbot Caspar Molitoris's Liber Originum, was founded by Guta, a nun from Sitzenkirch Monastery in Lörrach, in 1181. The monastery's original building was probably right on the Rhine bank, but was later rebuilt closer to Auggen.

In 1219, the town was declared a free imperial city by Frederick II, Holy Roman Emperor; this was confirmed in 1274. The town flourished in the Middle Ages and achieved political importance because of its location on the Rhine. Between 1272/73 and 1283, Johannes Brunwart was Schultheiß of Neuenburg; five of his (conventional) Minnesang poems are collected in the early-14th c. Codex Manesse.

On December 24, 1292, the city of King Adolf of Nassau received the Adolphinische privilege. In 1302, a devastating flood of the Rhine almost destroyed half the city. In 1311, the town came to the Habsburgs and became a part of Further Austria. In 1403, King Rupert extended the city law. In 1525, another flood destroyed half of the city, as well as the once so magnificent minster to the choir.

The Thirty Years' War took place between 1618 and 1648. Troops of various origins moved through the city; them and the entire environment had to endure different occupations, many lootings as well as destruction. The loss of population was very high. In 1675, the Neuenburg Capuchin Monastery, which had only been built in 1612, was slighted by Vauban. In the War of the Spanish Succession, Neuenburg got into the war zone as well, especially before the Battle of Friedlingen near Basel on October 14, 1702. In April 1704, after two years of French occupation, Neuenburg was completely destroyed at the command of King Louis XIV of France, and the population was taken up in the territory of the Prince-Bishopric of Basel in Schliengen and Steinenstadt. In the following years and decades, more wars of succession took place. Again and again, there were clashes between Habsburg on the right side of the Rhine and France on the left side of the Rhine, while Neuenburg as a so-called "front city" changed occupation several times.

After the conquest of the right-Rhine areas by Napoléon Bonaparte and the reorganization of the ownerships by him, the Habsburgs lost the territories of Further Austria. In 1806, the city of Neuenburg was incorporated into the 1806 newly founded Grand Duchy of Baden, which became a state of the German Reich in 1871.

20th Century

After the attack of the Wehrmacht on France in 1940, Neuenburg was under fire. It was the first German city to be completely destroyed during the Second World War.

In 1962/1963, the new construction of a road bridge in combination with a single track railway bridge was completed. It leads over the Rhine, which is now divided into the Altrhein and the Grand Canal d'Alsace, and it inaugurated on August, 1963.

In April 1945, after the conquest by the French Army, World War II ended for Neuenburg. The city became part of the French zone of occupation and part of South Baden. In 1952, South Baden, together with Württemberg-Hohenzollern and Württemberg-Baden, became the new federal state Baden-Württemberg.

On December 19, 1959, the route Neuenburg - Märkt on the Grand Canal d'Alsace was inaugurated solemnly.

Incorporations

On December 1, 1971, Zienken was incorporated into Neuenburg. On January 1, Grißheim's incorporation followed and the municipality Steinenstadt was incorporated on January 1, 1975. The city has been carrying the name addition "am Rhein" since March 18, 1975.

Politics

Municipal council

The municipal council in Neuenburg currently has 24 seats, with 10 seats belonging to the [[Christian Democratic Union of Germany
|Christlich Demokratische Union Deutschlands]], 9 seats belonging to the Freie Wählervereinigung Neuenburg e. V., and 5 seats belonging to the Sozialdemokratische Partei Deutschlands. The major is the chairman of the municipal council and is allowed to vote.

Mayor

Since 1991, and after reelections in 1999, 2007 and 2015, Joachim Schuster (CDU) (born 1956) is the major of Neuenburg am Rhein.

However, the election of 2015 was declared invalid by the administrative court of Freiburg because of a newspaper article that seemed too biased. The election was repeated in March 2016, and Schuster was reelected with more than 72 percent of the votes.

Coat of arms

The blazon of the coat of arms says "In red a golden slanting bar".

Sons and daughters of the town

 Matthias of Neuenburg (1295-1364), chronicler and bishop of Strasbourg
 Uli Edel (b. 1947), film director
 Mike Jenkins (b. 1985), American football player
 Andreas Bornemann (b. 1971), former German soccer player and now chairman of the 1. FC Nurnberg

References

External links
 

Breisgau-Hochschwarzwald
Populated places on the Rhine
Free imperial cities
Baden